The men's heavyweight event was part of the boxing programme at the 1920 Summer Olympics.  The weight class was the heaviest contested, allowing boxers weighing over 175 pounds (79.4 kilograms). The competition was held from August 21, 1920 to August 24, 1920. Nine boxers from eight nations competed.

Results

References

Sources
 
 

Heavyweight